Haren is a railway station located in Haren, Netherlands. The current station was opened on 29 September 1968 and is located on the Meppel–Groningen railway. Train services are operated by Nederlandse Spoorwegen.

A previous railway station serviced Haren between 1 May 1870, when the Meppel–Groningen railway line was opened, and 15 May 1936. The line was operated at the time by the Company for the Exploitation of the State Railways. The former station was closed because of its distance to the village. The new station, at a new location, was opened in 1968 after a new neighbourhood was built near the railway line.

Train services

Bus services

References

External links
 Haren station, station information

Buildings and structures in Groningen (city)
Transport in Groningen (city)
Railway stations in Groningen (province)
Railway stations on the Staatslijn C
Railway stations opened in 1870
Railway stations closed in 1936
Railway stations opened in 1968